AJPH may refer to:

 Australian Journal of Politics and History
 Australian Journal of Primary Health
 The American Journal of Public Health